Marino Polini (born 9 March 1959) is an Italian former professional racing cyclist. He rode in the 1986 Tour de France.

References

External links
 

1959 births
Living people
Italian male cyclists
Cyclists from the Province of Bergamo